Thomas Boylston Adams (July 25, 1910 – June 4, 1997) was an American business executive, writer, academician, and political candidate.

Early life
Adams was born on July 25, 1910, in Kansas City, Missouri. His parents were John Francis Adams and Marian Morse Adams, and his grandfather was Charles Francis Adams Jr., through whom he was a member of the Adams political family of Massachusetts and a descendant of American presidents John Adams and John Quincy Adams.

Adams graduated from the Groton School and then attended Harvard College. He was a captain in the United States Army Air Corps during World War II, a vice president of the Sheraton Corporation of America from 1954 to 1963, and president of Adams Securities from 1964 to 1968.

Career
Adams was president of the Massachusetts Historical Society (1957–1975) and treasurer of the American Academy of Arts and Sciences (1955–1990). He was a trustee of the Adams papers (a collection of 300,000 pages of diaries, letters and other writings papers from four generations of his family) and helped organize them for public use. He was a columnist for The Boston Globe from 1974 to 1991.

In 1966, Adams, an early and vocal opponent of the Vietnam War, ran a quixotic campaign as a peace candidate for the Democratic nomination for the United States Senate, against two far better-known candidates: former governor Endicott Peabody and Boston mayor John F. Collins. Adams got about 8% of the vote as Peabody won the nomination (and was easily defeated in turn by Republican Edward Brooke). He ran for Congress in 1968 and was a delegate to the 1972 Democratic National Convention.

Personal life
Adams was married for 57 years to the former Ramelle Frost Cochrane; the couple had five children.

Adams died on June 4, 1997, in Lincoln, Massachusetts.

Published works

References

Family tree

Adams political family
1910 births
1997 deaths
Quincy family
Writers from Kansas City, Missouri
People from Lincoln, Massachusetts
Groton School alumni
Harvard College alumni
Massachusetts Democrats
American hoteliers
Writers from Massachusetts
United States Army Air Forces officers
United States Army Air Forces personnel of World War II
20th-century American businesspeople
Candidates in the 1966 United States elections
Candidates in the 1968 United States elections
American anti-war activists